Order of Karađorđe Star of Republika Srpska is an Order of the Republic of Srpska. It was established in 1993 by the Constitution of Republika Srpska and 'Law on orders and awards' valid since 28 April 1993.

It is named after Karađorđe.

Ranks
The Order of Karađorđe Star of Republika Srpska is a military decoration. This order has three classes. It is awarded for extraordinary successes in commanding and leading units of the Army of Republika Srpska in armed struggle. 
It can be awarded in peace for outstanding merits in the leadership and organization of the armed forces.

See also 
 Karađorđe
 Orders, decorations and medals of Republika Srpska

References

Orders, decorations, and medals of Republic of Srpska
Awards established in 1993